The 1990–91 NBA season was the Pacers' 15th season in the National Basketball Association, and 24th season as a franchise. In the off-season, the Pacers signed free agent Michael Williams. The Pacers would get off to a slow start with a 9–16 record, as head coach Dick Versace was fired and replaced with Bob Hill. Under Hill, the Pacers held a 19–27 record at the All-Star break, but played above .500 for the remainder of the season, posting a six-game winning streak in February, and finishing fifth in the Central Division with a 41–41 record.

Reggie Miller averaged 22.6 points and 1.3 steals per game, while Chuck Person averaged 18.4 points and 5.0 rebounds per game, and Detlef Schrempf provided the team with 16.1 points and 8.0 rebounds per game off the bench, and was named Sixth Man of the Year. In addition, Vern Fleming provided with 12.7 points and 5.3 assists per game, while Williams contributed 11.1 points, 4.8 assists and 2.1 steals per game, Rik Smits averaged 10.9 points, 4.7 rebounds and 1.5 blocks per game, and LaSalle Thompson provided with 7.6 points and 6.9 rebounds per game.

In the playoffs, the Pacers faced off against Larry Bird, and the 2nd-seeded Boston Celtics in the Eastern Conference First Round. The  Pacers managed to even the series at two games a piece, but lost by just three points in Game 5 at the Boston Garden, 124–121, where Bird got injured during the game, but returned to score 32 points.

For the season, the Pacers changed their primary logo, removing the arm from the letter "P" from the previous logo, and changed their uniforms, adding navy blue to their color scheme. The jerseys remained in use until 1997, while the logo lasted until 2005.

Draft picks

Roster

Regular season

Season standings

y - clinched division title
x - clinched playoff spot

z - clinched division title
y - clinched division title
x - clinched playoff spot

Record vs. opponents

Game log

Regular season

|- align="center" bgcolor="#ccffcc"
| 1
| November 2, 1990
| New Jersey
| W 100–81
|
|
|
| Market Square Arena
| 1–0
|- align="center" bgcolor="#ffcccc"
| 2
| November 3, 1990
| @ Atlanta
| L 120–121
|
|
|
| The Omni
| 1–1
|- align="center" bgcolor="#ccffcc"
| 3
| November 6, 1990
| Minnesota
| W 98–96
|
|
|
| Market Square Arena
| 2–1
|- align="center" bgcolor="#ccffcc"
| 4
| November 9, 1990
| Cleveland
| W 122–107
|
|
|
| Market Square Arena
| 3–1
|- align="center" bgcolor="#ffcccc"
| 5
| November 10, 1990
| @ Miami
| L 105–120
|
|
|
| Miami Arena
| 3–2
|- align="center" bgcolor="#ffcccc"
| 6
| November 13, 1990
| Philadelphia
| L 100–108
|
|
|
| Market Square Arena
| 3–3
|- align="center" bgcolor="#ffcccc"
| 7
| November 14, 1990
| @ Cleveland
| L 95–113
|
|
|
| Richfield Coliseum
| 3–4
|- align="center" bgcolor="#ccffcc"
| 8
| November 16, 1990
| Miami
| W 106–80
|
|
|
| Market Square Arena
| 4–4
|- align="center" bgcolor="#ffcccc"
| 9
| November 17, 1990
| @ Orlando
| L 89–96
|
|
|
| Orlando Arena
| 4–5
|- align="center" bgcolor="#ffcccc"
| 10
| November 21, 1990
| Detroit
| L 100–108 (OT)
|
|
|
| Market Square Arena
| 4–6
|- align="center" bgcolor="#ccffcc"
| 11
| November 23, 1990
| Houston
| W 112–111
|
|
|
| Market Square Arena
| 5–6
|- align="center" bgcolor="#ffcccc"
| 12
| November 24, 1990
| @ Washington
| L 105–107 (OT)
|
|
|
| Capital Centre
| 5–7
|- align="center" bgcolor="#ffcccc"
| 13
| November 27, 1990
| @ Milwaukee
| L 98–112
|
|
|
| Bradley Center
| 5–8
|- align="center" bgcolor="#ffcccc"
| 14
| November 28, 1990
| @ Philadelphia
| L 106–116
|
|
|
| The Spectrum
| 5–9
|- align="center" bgcolor="#ffcccc"
| 15
| November 30, 1990
| @ Chicago
| L 95–124
|
|
|
| Chicago Stadium
| 5–10

|- align="center" bgcolor="#ccffcc"
| 16
| December 2, 1990
| Milwaukee
| W 107–103
|
|
|
| Market Square Arena
| 6–10
|- align="center" bgcolor="#ffcccc"
| 17
| December 4, 1990
| @ Minnesota
| L 81–83
|
|
|
| Target Center
| 6–11
|- align="center" bgcolor="#ccffcc"
| 18
| December 5, 1990
| Phoenix
| W 126–121
|
|
|
| Market Square Arena
| 7–11
|- align="center" bgcolor="#ffcccc"
| 19
| December 7, 1990
| Portland
| L 105–127
|
|
|
| Market Square Arena
| 7–12
|- align="center" bgcolor="#ccffcc"
| 20
| December 8, 1990
| Cleveland
| W 114–99
|
|
|
| Market Square Arena
| 8–12
|- align="center" bgcolor="#ffcccc"
| 21
| December 11, 1990
| @ Portland
| L 96–122
|
|
|
| Memorial Coliseum
| 8–13
|- align="center" bgcolor="#ffcccc"
| 22
| December 12, 1990
| @ Seattle
| L 90–99
|
|
|
| Seattle Center Coliseum
| 8–14
|- align="center" bgcolor="#ccffcc"
| 23
| December 15, 1990
| @ Utah
| W 124–116
|
|
|
| Salt Palace
| 9–14
|- align="center" bgcolor="#ffcccc"
| 24
| December 16, 1990
| @ L.A. Lakers
| L 112–115
|
|
|
| Great Western Forum
| 9–15
|- align="center" bgcolor="#ffcccc"
| 25
| December 19, 1990
| Washington
| L 112–114 (OT)
|
|
|
| Market Square Arena
| 9–16
|- align="center" bgcolor="#ccffcc"
| 26
| December 21, 1990
| Charlotte
| W 137–114
|
|
|
| Market Square Arena
| 10–16
|- align="center" bgcolor="#ffcccc"
| 27
| December 22, 1990
| @ Chicago
| L 118–128
|
|
|
| Chicago Stadium
| 10–17
|- align="center" bgcolor="#ffcccc"
| 28
| December 26, 1990
| @ Boston
| L 132–152
|
|
|
| Boston Garden
| 10–18
|- align="center" bgcolor="#ccffcc"
| 29
| December 29, 1990
| New Jersey
| W 114–105
|
|
|
| Market Square Arena
| 11–18

|- align="center" bgcolor="#ccffcc"
| 30
| January 2, 1991
| San Antonio
| W 121–109
|
|
|
| Market Square Arena
| 13–17
|- align="center" bgcolor="#ffcccc"
| 31
| January 4, 1991
| @ Atlanta
| L 96–111
|
|
|
| The Omni
| 13–18
|- align="center" bgcolor="#ffcccc"
| 32
| January 5, 1991
| @ Houston
| L 99–112
|
|
|
| The Summit
| 13–19
|- align="center" bgcolor="#ffcccc"
| 33
| January 8, 1991
| L.A. Clippers
| L 107–122
|
|
|
| Market Square Arena
| 13–20
|- align="center" bgcolor="#ccffcc"
| 34
| January 10, 1991
| @ New York
| W 129–122
|
|
|
| Madison Square Garden
| 14–20
|- align="center" bgcolor="#ccffcc"
| 35
| January 12, 1991
| Milwaukee
| W 118–110
|
|
|
| Market Square Arena
| 15–20
|- align="center" bgcolor="#ffcccc"
| 36
| January 15, 1991
| Atlanta
| L 106–117
|
|
|
| Market Square Arena
| 15–21
|- align="center" bgcolor="#ffcccc"
| 37
| January 16, 1991
| @ Milwaukee
| L 119–126
|
|
|
| Bradley Center
| 15–22
|- align="center" bgcolor="#ccffcc"
| 38
| January 19, 1991
| Utah
| W 117–104
|
|
|
| Market Square Arena
| 15–23
|- align="center" bgcolor="#ffcccc"
| 39
| January 21, 1991
| L.A. Lakers
| L 114–120
|
|
|
| Market Square Arena
| 15–24
|- align="center" bgcolor="#ccffcc"
| 40
| January 23, 1991
| @ Philadelphia
| W 110–109
|
|
|
| The Spectrum
| 16–24
|- align="center" bgcolor="#ccffcc"
| 41
| January 25, 1991
| @ Washington
| W 106–100
|
|
|
| Baltimore Arena
| 17–24
|- align="center" bgcolor="#ccffcc"
| 42
| January 30, 1991
| Charlotte
| W 123–105
|
|
|
| Market Square Arena
| 18–24

|- align="center" bgcolor="#ffcccc"
| 43
| February 1, 1991
| @ Miami
| L 113–116
|
|
|
| Miami Arena
| 18–25
|- align="center" bgcolor="#ccffcc"
| 44
| February 2, 1991
| Seattle
| W 106–100
|
|
|
| Market Square Arena
| 19–25
|- align="center" bgcolor="#ffcccc"
| 45
| February 5, 1991
| @ Dallas
| L 109–114
|
|
|
| Reunion Arena
| 19–26
|- align="center" bgcolor="#ffcccc"
| 46
| February 7, 1991
| @ San Antonio
| L 108–118
|
|
|
| HemisFair Arena
| 19–27
|- align="center"
|colspan="9" bgcolor="#bbcaff"|All-Star Break
|- style="background:#cfc;"
|- bgcolor="#bbffbb"
|- align="center" bgcolor="#ffcccc"
| 47
| February 12, 1991
| New York
| L 110–114
|
|
|
| Market Square Arena
| 19–28
|- align="center" bgcolor="#ccffcc"
| 48
| February 13, 1991
| @ Detroit
| W 105–101
|
|
|
| The Palace of Auburn Hills
| 20–28
|- align="center" bgcolor="#ccffcc"
| 49
| February 17, 1991
| Sacramento
| W 113–110
|
|
|
| Market Square Arena
| 21–28
|- align="center" bgcolor="#ccffcc"
| 50
| February 19, 1991
| @ Charlotte
| W 115–102
|
|
|
| Charlotte Coliseum
| 22–28
|- align="center" bgcolor="#ccffcc"
| 51
| February 20, 1991
| Orlando
| W 122–120 (OT)
|
|
|
| Market Square Arena
| 23–28
|- align="center" bgcolor="#ccffcc"
| 52
| February 22, 1991
| @ Cleveland
| W 106–98
|
|
|
| Richfield Coliseum
| 24–28
|- align="center" bgcolor="#ccffcc"
| 53
| February 24, 1991
| Boston
| W 115–109
|
|
|
| Market Square Arena
| 25–28
|- align="center" bgcolor="#ffcccc"
| 54
| February 26, 1991
| @ New Jersey
| L 104–129
|
|
|
| Brendan Byrne Arena
| 25–29
|- align="center" bgcolor="#ffcccc"
| 55
| February 27, 1991
| Dallas
| L 104–108
|
|
|
| Market Square Arena
| 25–30

|- align="center" bgcolor="#ccffcc"
| 56
| March 1, 1991
| Cleveland
| W 118–115
|
|
|
| Market Square Arena
| 26–30
|- align="center" bgcolor="#ccffcc"
| 57
| March 2, 1991
| Chicago
| W 135–114
|
|
|
| Market Square Arena
| 27–30
|- align="center" bgcolor="#ffcccc"
| 58
| March 4, 1991
| @ Boston
| L 101–126
|
|
|
| Hartford Civic Center
| 27–31
|- align="center" bgcolor="#ccffcc"
| 59
| March 5, 1991
| Charlotte
| W 112–101
|
|
|
| Market Square Arena
| 28–31
|- align="center" bgcolor="#ccffcc"
| 60
| March 7, 1991
| Denver
| W 145–125
|
|
|
| Market Square Arena
| 29–31
|- align="center" bgcolor="#ffcccc"
| 61
| March 9, 1991
| Detroit
| L 112–114
|
|
|
| Market Square Arena
| 29–32
|- align="center" bgcolor="#ffcccc"
| 62
| March 12, 1991
| @ Golden State
| L 117–129
|
|
|
| Oakland-Alameda County Coliseum Arena
| 29–33
|- align="center" bgcolor="#ccffcc"
| 63
| March 14, 1991
| @ Sacramento
| W 107–103
|
|
|
| ARCO Arena
| 29–34
|- align="center" bgcolor="#ccffcc"
| 64
| March 15, 1991
| @ L.A. Clippers
| W 121–109
|
|
|
| Los Angeles Memorial Sports Arena
| 30–34
|- align="center" bgcolor="#ccffcc"
| 65
| March 17, 1991
| @ Denver
| W 130–92
|
|
|
| McNichols Sports Arena
| 31–34
|- align="center" bgcolor="#ffcccc"
| 66
| March 18, 1991
| @ Phoenix
| L 103–111
|
|
|
| Arizona Veterans Memorial Coliseum
| 32–34
|- align="center" bgcolor="#ccffcc"
| 67
| March 20, 1991
| Miami
| W 117–107
|
|
|
| Market Square Arena
| 33–34
|- align="center" bgcolor="#ccffcc"
| 68
| March 22, 1991
| Boston
| W 121–109
|
|
|
| Market Square Arena
| 34–34
|- align="center" bgcolor="#ffcccc"
| 69
| March 23, 1991
| @ Chicago
| L 119–133
|
|
|
| Chicago Stadium
| 34–35
|- align="center" bgcolor="#ccffcc"
| 70
| March 26, 1991
| Atlanta
| W 123–113
|
|
|
| Market Square Arena
| 35–35
|- align="center" bgcolor="#ffcccc"
| 71
| March 27, 1991
| @ Detroit
| L 93–102
|
|
|
| The Palace of Auburn Hills
| 35–36
|- align="center" bgcolor="#ccffcc"
| 72
| March 31, 1991
| Golden State
| W 127–120 (OT)
|
|
|
| Market Square Arena
| 36–36

|- align="center" bgcolor="#ffcccc"
| 73
| April 3, 1991
| Philadelphia
| L 112–114
|
|
|
| Market Square Arena
| 36–37
|- align="center" bgcolor="#ccffcc"
| 74
| April 5, 1991
| Washington
| W 117–103
|
|
|
| Market Square Arena
| 37–37
|- align="center" bgcolor="#ffcccc"
| 75
| April 6, 1991
| @ Atlanta
| L 110–137
|
|
|
| The Omni
| 37–38
|- align="center" bgcolor="#ccffcc"
| 76
| April 9, 1991
| @ Charlotte
| W 122–120
|
|
|
| Charlotte Coliseum
| 38–38
|- align="center" bgcolor="#ffcccc"
| 77
| April 10, 1991
| Chicago
| L 96–101
|
|
|
| Market Square Arena
| 38–39
|- align="center" bgcolor="#ffcccc"
| 78
| April 12, 1991
| @ New York
| L 108–112
|
|
|
| Madison Square Garden
| 38–40
|- align="center" bgcolor="#ccffcc"
| 79
| April 14, 1991
| Detroit
| W 125–107
|
|
|
| Market Square Arena
| 39–40
|- align="center" bgcolor="#ccffcc"
| 80
| April 16, 1991
| @ New Jersey
| W 132–126
|
|
|
| Brendan Byrne Arena
| 40–40
|- align="center" bgcolor="#ccffcc"
| 81
| April 19, 1991
| New York
| W 130–118
|
|
|
| Market Square Arena
| 41–40
|- align="center" bgcolor="#ffcccc"
| 82
| April 20, 1991
| @ Milwaukee
| L 100–133
|
|
|
| Bradley Center
| 41–41

Playoffs

|- align="center" bgcolor="#ffcccc"
| 1
| April 26, 1991
| @ Boston
| L 120–127
| Reggie Miller (24)
| Detlef Schrempf (10)
| Chuck Person (39)
| Boston Garden14,890
| 0–1
|- align="center" bgcolor="#ccffcc"
| 2
| April 28, 1991
| @ Boston
| W 130–118
| Chuck Person (39)
| Dreiling, Schrempf (7)
| Micheal Williams (10)
| Boston Garden14,890
| 1–1
|- align="center" bgcolor="#ffcccc"
| 3
| May 1, 1991
| Boston
| L 105–112
| Miller, Schrempf (20)
| Detlef Schrempf (10)
| Micheal Williams (7)
| Market Square Arena16,530
| 1–2
|- align="center" bgcolor="#ccffcc"
| 4
| May 3, 1991
| Boston
| W 116–113
| Chuck Person (30)
| LaSalle Thompson (7)
| Micheal Williams (9)
| Market Square Arena16,530
| 2–2
|- align="center" bgcolor="#ffcccc"
| 5
| May 5, 1991
| @ Boston
| L 121–124
| Chuck Person (32)
| LaSalle Thompson (9)
| Micheal Williams (10)
| Boston Garden14,890
| 2–3
|-

Player statistics

Season

Playoffs

Player Statistics Citation:

Awards and records
 Detlef Schrempf, NBA Sixth Man of the Year Award

Transactions

References

See also
 1990-91 NBA season

Indiana Pacers seasons
Pace
Pace
Indiana